Andrew Poysell Ireland (born August 23, 1930) is an American banker and politician and former U.S. Representative from Florida. From 1977 to 1993, he served eight terms, first as a Democrat, then as a Republican after switching parties in 1984.

Biography
Born to a wealthy family in Cincinnati, Ohio, he attended a private school within the city. He finished his high school career at Phillips Academy in Andover, Massachusetts. Ireland earned his undergraduate degree in business at Yale University and did graduate studies at Columbia University. Ireland joined Barnett National Bank in Jacksonville, Florida, in 1954, and in 1962 he became the president, chairman and chief executive officer, of American National Bank of Winter Haven, Florida. From 1968 to 1970, Ireland served as a member of the board of the Federal Reserve Bank in Atlanta, Georgia.

Ireland became involved in politics in 1966, when he successfully ran for the position of Winter Haven city commissioner. In 1981, he served as a delegate to the United Nations. Ireland was elected as a Democrat to the 95th United States Congress and to the three succeeding Congresses.

On March 17, 1984, however, he announced that he had become a Republican, with his party switch becoming official on July 8. He had been one of the more conservative Democrats in the Florida delegation, and had become increasingly uncomfortable with the leftward bent of the national party; in a speech announcing his switch, he said, "I didn't leave the Democratic Party, the Democratic Party left me." Even before his switch, Ireland had worn his party ties so loosely that Speaker Tip O'Neill mused that Ireland "wasn't much of a Democrat anyway."  Future Republican National Committee chairman Ed Gillespie, who was a staffer in Ireland's office at the time and switched parties soon after his boss, said that he and Ireland were classic examples of Reagan Democrats who became Republicans–"a southern conservative and a young northeastern ethnic Catholic who no longer felt comfortable in the party of their heritage." All but a few of Ireland's staffers stayed on after the switch, though some of them remained Democrats.

Ireland was reelected as a Republican to the 99th United States Congress and to the three succeeding Congresses. He served in the House of Representatives from January 3, 1977, to January 3, 1993, before retiring.

See also
 List of American politicians who switched parties in office
 List of United States representatives who switched parties

References

External links

The Washington Post Members of Congress / Andy Ireland

1930 births
Living people
Politicians from Cincinnati
People from Polk County, Florida
Permanent Representatives of the United States to the United Nations
Phillips Academy alumni
Yale University alumni
Columbia University alumni
Louisiana State University alumni
Florida Democrats
Florida city council members
Republican Party members of the United States House of Representatives from Florida
Democratic Party members of the United States House of Representatives
People from Lee County, Florida
American chief executives of financial services companies
Federal Reserve Bank people
Businesspeople from Florida

Members of Congress who became lobbyists